The ju-jitsu events at the 2001 World Games in Akita was played between 19 and 20 August. 71 athletes, from 15 nations, participated in the tournament. The ju-jitsu competition took place at Akita Prefectural Gymnasium.

Participating nations

Medal table

Events

Duo

Men's fighting

Women's fighting

References

External links
 JJIF
 Ju-jitsu on IWGA website
 Results

 
2001 World Games
2001